The Cassville Tigers were a minor league baseball team based in Cassville, Missouri in 1935. With the Tigers succeeded by the 1936 Cassville Blues, Cassville played as members of the Class D level Arkansas State League in 1935 and the Arkansas-Missouri League in 1936. Cassville hosted home games at the Cassville Athletic Park. 

Cassville was a minor league affiliate of the Detroit Tigers in 1935 and the Chicago White Sox in 1936.

History 
The Cassville area had hosted semi–professional teams prior to securing a minor league franchise.

Cassville first hosted minor league baseball in 1935 when the Class D level Arkansas State League League expanded to six teams, adding both the Huntsville Red Birds and Cassville Tigers as expansion teams. Cassville began minor league play as an affiliate of the Detroit Tigers, adopting their moniker.

Playing home games at Cassville Athletic Park, the Cassville Tigers began play in the 1935 Arkansas State League. The Cassville Tigers finished their first season of play with a 54–48 record. The Tigers placed 3rd in the Arkansas State League standings, playing under manager Ed Hawk. Cassville finished behind the 1st place Siloam Springs Travelers and 2nd place Rogers Cardinals in the regular season standings.

The Arkansas State League became the Class D level Arkansas-Missouri League in 1936. Cassville continued play as the Cassville Blues, an affiliate of the Chicago White Sox. The Cassville Blues placed 3rd in the 1936 Arkansas-Missouri League and advanced to the playoff finals. The Blues had ended the 1936 regular season with a record of 61–59, playing under Managers Gary Coker, Clifford Clay and Zeke Gansauer. In the Arkansas-Missouri League Finals, the Siloam Springs Travelers defeated Cassville 4 games to 3.

After the 1936 season, both the Cassville and Bentonville Mustangs franchises folded from the Arkansas-Missouri League due to financial reasons.

Cassville, Missouri has not hosted another minor league franchise.

The ballpark
The Cassville teams minor league teams played home games at Cassville Athletic Park. The ballpark had a capacity of 1,000 and dimensions (Left, Center, Right) of: 320–450–385. The facility reportedly featured makeshift bleachers and a chicken wire backstop. Some fans allegedly sneaked into the games through the Reed Gym construction area located behind left field. Cassville Athletic Park was located at Mill Street & West 7th Street, Cassville, Missouri.

Timeline

Year–by–year records

Notable alumni
Woody Fair (1935)
Ed Hawk (1935, MGR)

See also
Cassville Tigers players

References

Defunct minor league baseball teams
Professional baseball teams in Missouri
Defunct baseball teams in Missouri
Baseball teams established in 1935
Baseball teams disestablished in 1935
Barry County, Missouri
Detroit Tigers minor league affiliates
Defunct Arkansas State League teams
Defunct Arkansas-Missouri League teams